Araragi is a genus of butterflies in the family Lycaenidae. It is a small East Asian hairstreak genus. The larvae feed on Juglans (walnut) species.

Species
Araragi enthea (Janson, 1877)
Araragi sugiyamai Matsui, 1989
Araragi panda Hsu & Chou, 2001

External links

"Araragi Sibatani & Ito, 1942" at Markku Savela's Lepidoptera and Some Other Life Forms
Images representing Araragi at Encyclopedia of Life

Theclini
Lycaenidae genera